The Smith & Wesson Model 19 is a revolver produced by Smith & Wesson that was introduced in 1957 on its K-frame. The Model 19 is chambered for .357 Magnum. The K-frame is somewhat smaller and lighter than the original N-frame .357, usually known as the Smith & Wesson Model 27. A stainless steel variant of the Model 19, the Smith & Wesson Model 66, was introduced in 1971.

History
The .357 Magnum is the oldest "magnum" handgun cartridge. Smith & Wesson played a major part in the development and success of the cartridge and revolver that went with it. Firearms writer and experimenter Philip Sharpe is credited for its development during the 1930s when police agencies were asking for a more powerful round. S&W's Douglas B. Wesson agreed to produce a new revolver that would handle "high-intensity" .38 Special loads, but only if Winchester would develop a new cartridge. Elmer Keith, a well known author and wildcatter at the time, was experimenting with hand loading .38 Special ammunition beyond their original specifications, taking advantage of the newer and better designed firearm frames and metallurgy, and also played a major role in the development of the .357 Magnum. Winchester introduced the .357 Magnum, which was dimensionally identical to the .38 Special except for a .125 inch longer case, and the first revolvers (referred to as ".357 Magnum Models") were completed by S&W on April 8, 1935.

Retired Assistant Chief Patrol Inspector of the U.S. Border Patrol, famous gunfighter, and noted firearms and shooting skills writer Bill Jordan consulted with Smith & Wesson on the design and characteristics of the Model 19. Jordan's idea for a "peace officer's dream" sidearm was a heavy-barreled four-inch K-Frame .357 Magnum with a shrouded barrel like the big N-frame .357 and adjustable sights. After a year of experimentation with improved-strength steels and special heat-treating processes, the result was the .357 Combat Magnum (later designated Model 19), with the first serial-number gun (K260,000) presented to Jordan on November 15, 1955.

The .357 Magnum, four-inch barreled model was standard issue to uniformed officers of the former U.S. Immigration and Naturalization Service as well as Patrol Agents of the U.S. Border Patrol until both agencies adopted .40 caliber semi-automatic pistols.

A rare S&W M19-3 was built for the French GIGN. In 1972 they ordered 500 of these revolvers that have serial numbers in the M&P range from D639300 to 639800. With only 500 guns produced, this is the rarest M19 version.

This specific model 19-3 has a fixed sight and is pinned & recessed. It  has a three inch barrel.

Styles

The Model 19 was produced in blued carbon steel or nickel-plated steel with wood or rubber combat grips, an adjustable rear sight, full-target or semi-target hammer, serrated wide target trigger or combat-type trigger, and was available in 2.5" (3": Model 66—rare), 4", or 6-inch barrel lengths.  The weights are 30.5 ounces, 36 ounces, and 39 ounces, respectively. The 2.5- and 3-inch barrel versions had round butts, while the others had square butts.

The Model 19 was produced from 1957 (first model number stampings) to November 1999.  The Model 66 was produced from 1970 until 2005. The Model 66 differed by its use of stainless steel and its smooth target-type trigger. The Model 68 was a limited-production version of the Model 66 made for the California Highway Patrol and Los Angeles Police Department chambered in .38 Special with a 6" barrel. The Model 19 and the Model 66 had the same trigger options. One of the last variations of the Model 19 ordered for police use was the 2.5" Model 19-5, special ordered under SKU #100701 as the standard issue sidearm for Special Agents of the US Department of State's Diplomatic Security Service. This model featured a .400" wide, smooth "combat" trigger, Pachmayr Professional Compac rubber grips, and most notably a matte black finish instead of the common high-polished blue.The 2.5" barrelled Model 66 was carried by I&NS Special Agents until the mid 1990's when the agency adopted a .40 caliber semi-automatic pistol as its standard issue sidearm.

Engineering changes were designated with a "dash-" number after the model number. The engineering changes are as follows:

Model 19 variants

Model 66

Model 68

Criminal use
Two Model 19s, along with two Browning Hi-Power pistols, were used in the 1996 Dunblane massacre. This led to the enactment of Firearms (Amendment) Act 1997 and Firearms (Amendment) (No. 2) Act 1997, effectively banning handguns in the UK.

References

External links
 S&W M19 under S&W M&P revolver.

Smith & Wesson revolvers
Revolvers of the United States
.357 Magnum firearms
Police weapons
Weapons and ammunition introduced in 1956